Pitonga is a small village located on the Ndogo Laguna between the town of Gamba and the village of Setté Cama, near Mougambi.

Populated places in Ogooué-Maritime Province